Parasarpa is a genus of butterflies. Parasarpa hollandi ranges from Lombok to Timor. Parasarpa albidior and Parasarpa houlberti are known only from Yunnan. The three other species occur in northern India and southern China.

Species
Parasarpa albomaculata (Leech, 1891)
Parasarpa albidior (Hall, 1930)
Parasarpa dudu (Doubleday, [1848]) – white commodore
Parasarpa hollandi Doherty, 1891
Parasarpa houlberti (Oberthür, 1913)
Parasarpa zayla (Doubleday, [1848]) – bicolor commodore

References

External links
Niklas Wahlberg Phylogeny

Limenitidinae
Nymphalidae genera
Taxa named by Frederic Moore